Gallium(III) sulfate refers to the chemical compound, a salt, with the formula Ga2(SO4)3, or its hydrates Ga2(SO4)3·xH2O. Gallium metal dissolves in sulfuric acid to form solutions containing [Ga(OH2)6]3+ and SO42− ions. The octadecahydrate Ga2(SO4)3·18H2O crystallises from these solutions at room temperature. This hydrate loses water in stages when heated, forming the anhydrate Ga2(SO4)3 above 150 °C and completely above 310 °C. Anhydrous Ga2(SO4)3 is isostructural with iron(III) sulfate, crystallizing in the rhombohedral space group R.

Preparation
Gallium(III) sulfate is prepared from the reaction of hydroxygallium diacetate and sulfuric acid. The two reactants were mixed at 90 °C and left for 2 days which produced the octadecahydrate. Then, it was dried in a vacuum for 2 hours which created the extremely hygroscopic anhydrous form. The overall reaction is below:

2Ga(CH3COO)2OH + 3H2SO4 → Ga2(SO4)3 + 4CH3COOH + 2H2O

After the production, it was confirmed to be the simple salt, Ga2(SO4)3, by x-ray diffraction.

Properties
When heated over 749 °C, gallium sulfate gives off sulfur trioxide, yielding gallium(III) oxide.
A gallium sulfate solution in water mixed with zinc sulfate can precipitate ZnGa2O4.

Derivatives
Basic gallium sulfate is known with the formula (H3O)Ga3(SO4)2(OH)6.

Double gallium sulfates are known with composition NaGa3(SO4)2(OH)6, KGa3(SO4)2(OH)6, RbGa3(SO4)2(OH)6, NH4Ga3(SO4)2(OH)6. These are isostructural with jarosite and alunite, and these minerals can have gallium substituted for iron or aluminium. Organic base double gallium sulfates can contain different core structures, these can be chains of [Ga(SO4)3]3-, [Ga(OH)(SO4)2]2- or [Ga(H2O)2(SO4)2]− or sheets of [Ga(H2O)2(SO4)2]− units.

References

Gallium compounds
Sulfates
Catalysts